Louis Bellson at The Flamingo is a live album by American jazz drummer Louis Bellson featuring performances recorded in Las Vegas in 1957 for the Verve label.

Reception

AllMusic awarded the album 3 stars.

Track listing
All compositions by Louis Bellson except as indicated
 "Flamingo Blues" - 6:34
 "Driftwood" - 3:37
 "Opus 7-11" - 9:54
 "Broadway" (Billy Bird, Teddy McRae, Henri Woode) - 8:16
 "Medley: Love Is Here to Stay/Flamingo/Makin' Whoopee" (George Gershwin, Ira Gershwin/Ted Grouya, Edmund Anderson/Walter Donaldson, Gus Kahn) - 4:47
 "Sweet Georgia Brown" (Ben Bernie, Maceo Pinkard, Kenneth Casey) - 6:55

Personnel 
Louis Bellson – drums
Harry Edison - trumpet 
Don Abney - piano
Truck Parham - bass

References

Verve Records live albums
Louie Bellson live albums
1958 live albums
Albums recorded at the Flamingo Las Vegas